Wolfe Video is the oldest and largest exclusive producer and distributor of LGBT films in North America.

Founded in 1985 in New Almaden by Kathy Wolfe, the company began as a consumer mail order distribution company for lesbian VHS videos but has evolved over the years to become a full-service distributor of LGBT films. Wolfe releases LGBT films on DVD in North America as well as doing film festival bookings, foreign sales, US digital delivery, and broadcast sales for its library of more than one hundred feature films and dozens of shorts and documentaries.

Notable Wolfe releases over the years include the film Big Eden, the 20th Anniversary DVD release of Desert Hearts, Were the World Mine, and Thom Fitzgerald's AIDS drama 3 Needles. Significant Wolfe DVD releases in recent years include the Sundance Film Festival award-winner Undertow, the acclaimed French drama Tomboy, the praised Polish cyberthriller drama Suicide Room, the multiple award-winner Gayby, and Swedish lesbian romance Kiss Me (With Every Heartbeat).  Wolfe has also released two films by the writer and director Stephen Cone, including The Wise Kids and Henry Gamble's Birthday Party.

In June 2012 the company launched a new worldwide LGBT movie-watching platform, WolfeOnDemand.

In 2015, Wolfe Video donated its complete DVD library of lesbian movies to the June L. Mazer Lesbian Archives.

See also
List of lesbian, gay, bisexual, or transgender-related films by storyline

References

Further reading
 Ratcliff, Ashley (June 7, 2012).  Wolfe’s VOD Service Aims to Thwart Online Piracy. Home Media Magazine.

External links 
 WolfeVideo.com
 WolfeOnDemand.com
  Movie File ‘Sharing’ Goes Legit by Kathy Wolfe, The Huffington Post, June 7, 2012.

Film distributors of the United States
Companies established in 1985
Companies based in California
LGBT-related film
1985 establishments in California